Ein Yahav Airfield, officially known as Sapir Airfield (מנחת ספיר), is a small desert airfield in southern Israel's Arabah between the Dead Sea and Eilat. The airfield is located across Highway 90 from Sapir, and not far from Ein Yahav. It was constructed in 1970, and from 1989 until 2012 it had scheduled flights to the now-defunct Sde Dov Airport in Tel Aviv, operated by Elrom Airways. As of July 2019, there are no scheduled flights at the airport.

References

External links
 Ein Yahav Airfield
 Ein Yahav Airport

Airports in Israel
1970 establishments in Israel
Buildings and structures in Southern District (Israel)
Airports established in 1970